Charles Coleman, "CharlesInCharge", is an American record producer and songwriter. He began his musical journey as a member of the group, ICON. It was with the group that CharlesInCharge began to professionally produce and write music. To create he uses an AKAI MPC Studio, Universal Audio Apollo Twin, and a Macbook Pro.

In 2015, CharlesInCharge produced a song for the NBA's Golden State Warriors. The song "Dub Nation (Locked N' Loaded)" performed by Bay Area rapper Rich Cole references the team's 2015 postseason run.

CharlesInCharge has worked with the music legend Prince. He co-wrote "Under The Same Cloud" with Kip Blackshire on a song that featured Prince and "The Fonky Baldheadz", the opening band for Prince's 2001 "Hit'n Run Tour".

Using his first writer name he co-wrote and co-produced for the Unsigned: Twin Cities CD. 
The tracks "All I Do" and "Got It Locked" are performed by Alex Whitfield. The project was sponsored by BestBuy and Northwest Airlines.

In 2017, CharlesInCharge released his debut solo single, Cheat Code produced by Mindkilla.

He has collaborated with numerous successful musicians and brands including DJ Skee, Jake One, Focus…, Too $hort, Tory Lanez, 1500 or Nothin', Locksmith, Brooke Jean, Koen Heldens, Trevor Lawrence Jr., Tony Gaskins, Cleveland P. Jones, Kaydence, Marcus Phillips, G-Technology and Wrike.

Discography 
 Features group projects, solo projects, production credits and features

CharlesInCharge Solo Projects 
 List of songs performed by CharlesInCharge

CharlesInCharge Collaborations 

 CP (Co-Produced), CW (Co-Writer), PA (Performing Artist), Producer, N/A (Not Available)
 List of features with other performing artists, showing year released and song title

References

External links

CharlesInCharge AllMusic.com Page at 

1977 births
20th-century African-American people
American male singers
African-American male rappers
American male rappers
African-American record producers
American hip hop record producers
American multi-instrumentalists
Living people
21st-century American rappers
21st-century American male musicians
21st-century African-American musicians